Four Ashes railway station was a railway station built by the Grand Junction Railway in 1837. It served the small village of Four Ashes, Staffordshire, 6 miles north of Wolverhampton City Centre, and was located near to the A449 road, on Station Drive. It was also the closest station to the villages of Coven and Featherstone as well as the town of Brewood.

The station closed in 1959, although the Rugby-Birmingham-Stafford Line loop from the West Coast Main Line still runs through the site of the station today.

References

Staffordshire Past Track: Four Ashes Railway Station image
Railway Stations and Pub Names
Artifact Rescue

Disused railway stations in Staffordshire
Railway stations in Great Britain opened in 1837
Railway stations in Great Britain closed in 1959
Former London and North Western Railway stations